George Maneluk (born July 25, 1967) is a Canadian former professional ice hockey goaltender who played four games in the National Hockey League for the New York Islanders in the 1990–91 season.

Born in Winnipeg, Manitoba, Maneluk played his junior career for the Brandon Wheat Kings. Maneluk played nine professional seasons, most notably for the Springfield Indians of the American Hockey League, for whom he played parts of five seasons and backstopped the team to its sixth Calder Cup championship in 1990.

Career statistics

Regular season and playoffs

Awards and achievements 
 CHL Second All-Star Team (1995)

External links 

1967 births
Living people
Brandon Wheat Kings players
Capital District Islanders players
Ice hockey people from Winnipeg
Long Beach Ice Dogs (IHL) players
Louisiana IceGators (ECHL) players
Manitoba Bisons ice hockey players
Muskegon Fury players
New Haven Nighthawks players
New York Islanders draft picks
New York Islanders players
Peoria Rivermen (IHL) players
Phoenix Roadrunners (IHL) players
Springfield Indians players
Wichita Thunder players
Winston-Salem Thunderbirds players
Canadian ice hockey goaltenders